Moments (stylized MOMents) is a Filipino celebrity talk show hosted by Gladys Reyes and aired on Net 25. It is a show for mothers and kids that feature the different bonding moments, child-rearing styles and the many facets of motherhood. It airs Saturday mornings with replays on weekday mornings and Sundays.

Awards and nominations
Star Award for Best Celebrity Talk Show (25th PMPC Star Awards for TV) (2011)
1st MTRCB TV Awards: "Special Award for Promoting Family Values and Solidarity" (MTRCB) (September 4, 2009)
 Nominee for Best Children Show (MTRCB) (2009)
Anak TV Seal Award (Anak TV) (2009)

See also
 List of programs broadcast by Net 25

References

Philippine television talk shows
2007 Philippine television series debuts
Net 25 original programming
Filipino-language television shows